Caliban, son of the witch Sycorax, is an important character in William Shakespeare's play The Tempest.

His character is one of the few Shakespearean figures to take on a life of its own "outside" Shakespeare's own work: as Russell Hoban put it, "Caliban is one of the hungry ideas, he's always looking for someone to word him into being ... Caliban is a necessary idea".

Character 
Caliban is half human, half monster. After his island becomes occupied by Prospero and his daughter Miranda, Caliban is forced into slavery. While he is referred to as a calvaluna or mooncalf, a freckled monster, he is the only human inhabitant of the island that is otherwise "not honour'd with a human shape" (Prospero, I.2.283). In some traditions, he is depicted as a wild man, or a deformed man, or a beast man, or sometimes a mix of fish and man, a dwarf or even a tortoise.

Banished from Algiers, Sycorax was left on the isle, pregnant with Caliban, and died before Prospero's arrival. Caliban, despite his inhuman nature, clearly loved and worshipped his mother, referring to Setebos as his mother's god, and appealing to her powers against Prospero. Prospero explains his harsh treatment of Caliban by claiming that after initially befriending him, Caliban attempted to rape Miranda. Caliban confirms this gleefully, saying that if he had not been stopped, he would have peopled the island with a race of Calibans – "Thou didst prevent me, I had peopled else this isle with Calibans" (Act I:ii). Prospero then entraps Caliban and torments him with harmful magic if Caliban does not obey his orders. Resentful of Prospero, Caliban takes Stephano, one of the shipwrecked servants, as a god and as his new master. Caliban learns that Stephano is neither a god nor Prospero's equal in the conclusion of the play, however, and Caliban agrees to obey Prospero again.

Be not afeard; the isle is full of noises
Sounds, and sweet airs, that give delight and hurt not.
Sometimes a thousand twangling instruments
Will hum about mine ears; and sometime voices
That, if I then had waked after long sleep,
Will make me sleep again; and then in dreaming,
The clouds me thought would open, and show riches
Ready to drop upon me, that when I waked
I cried to dream again.

Name 

There is a long history of enthusiastic speculation on the name's origin or derivation.

One of the most prominent suggestions concerns Caliban being an anagram of the Spanish word  (Carib people), the source of cannibal in English. The character may be seen as a satire on "Noble cannibal" from Montaigne's Essays (A.30, "Of Cannibals").
 
The first Romanichal had arrived in England a century before Shakespeare's time.

Since 1889, it has been suggested that Shakespeare may have named Caliban after the Tunisian city Calibia (now called Kelibia) that is seen on maps of the Mediterranean dating to 1529.

Many other, though less notable, suggestions have been made, primarily in the 19th century, including an Arabic word for "vile dog", a Hindu  "satyr of Kalee, the Hindu Proserpine", German  ("codfish"), etc.

Notable portrayals 

 Ralph Richardson played Caliban on radio in a 1933 BBC National Programme production.
In the 1960 Hallmark Hall of Fame television adaptation, Caliban was played by Richard Burton.
In the 1960 Marlowe Dramatic Society And Professional Players unabridged recording (Argo Records, 216-218), Caliban is played by Patrick Wymark.
In the 1963 RSC production, Caliban was played by Roy Dotrice.
In the 1964 Shakespeare Recording Society unabridged recording (Caedmon Records, SRS 201), Caliban is played by Hugh Griffith.
In the 1974 BBC Radio 3 production, Caliban is played by Patrick Stewart.
In the 1978 RSC production directed by Clifford Williams, Caliban was played by David Suchet. 
In Derek Jarman's 1979 film adaptation, Caliban is portrayed by Jack Birkett.
In the 1980 BBC Television adaptation, Caliban was portrayed by Warren Clarke.
In the 1982 RSC production, Caliban was played by Bob Peck.
Caliban appears as the wild and lustful Greek Kalibanos (played by Raúl Juliá) in Paul Mazursky's film adaptation Tempest (1982).
In the 1983 Bard Productions videotaped production, Caliban was played by William Hootkins.
In Peter Greenaway's 1991 film Prospero's Books, Caliban was played by Scottish dancer Michael Clark.
In the 1992 animated version, Caliban was voiced by Alun Armstrong.
David Troughton played Caliban in the 1993 RSC production.
In the 1998 RSC production, Caliban was played by Robert Glenister.
Caliban appears as the bayou-dwelling "Gator Man" (played by John Pyper-Ferguson) in Jack Bender's 1998 TV film The Tempest (set in Mississippi during the Civil War).
In the 2000 RSC production, Caliban was played by Zubin Varla.
Adrian Herrero danced Caliban in the choreographic adaptation of The Tempest (La Tempestad) by the Ballet Contemporáneo of the Teatro General San Martín in Buenos Aires, Argentina, in 2008.
In the 2009 RSC production, Caliban was played by John Kani.
In Julie Taymor's 2010 film adaptation, Caliban is portrayed by Djimon Hounsou.
In Phyllida Lloyd's 2017 all-female Donmar Warehouse production set in a women's prison and performed by its inmates, Caliban was played by Sophie Stanton.
In the 2023 Round House Theatre production, co-directed by Teller and Aaron Posner, Caliban was played by Hassiem Muhammad and Ryan Sellers.

Other works 

In the 1844 preface to his main work, World as Will and Representation, the philosopher Schopenhauer refers to Hegel as a "spiritual Caliban".

Robert Browning's 1864 poem "Caliban upon Setebos" portrays Caliban speculating on the nature of Setebos, the god he believes in.

In the 1900 essay Ariel by Uruguayan author José Enrique Rodó, Caliban is the antagonist. 

In the film Clash of the Titans, the main antagonist is a character based on Caliban named Kalibos, the evil son of the sea goddess Thetis, transformed by Zeus from a handsome man into a monster as punishment for his malevolence.

In the 1956 science fiction film Forbidden Planet, Caliban is re-imagined as "the Monster from the Id", a wild and violent monster that is invisible to the naked eye. The monster later turns out to be born of the subconscious of the film's Prospero character, Dr. Morbius, using the advanced technology of the Krell. Like Caliban, the monster ultimately rebels and attempts to kill its master. Captain Adams confronts Dr. Morbius with the fact that he is giving form to his subconscious, and his guilty conscience, from having brought it into existence, finally ends the monster's destructive rampage.

In John Fowles's 1963 novel The Collector, Miranda refers to her kidnapper as Caliban.

In J. G. Ballard's 1965 novel The Drought, Lomax refers to Quilter as his Caliban.

In the 1965 movie Doctor Zhivago, during the scene where Victor Komarovsky convinces Zhivago to allow him to rescue Lara by taking her to Vladivostok, Komarovsky refers to himself as a Caliban: "Do you accept the protection of this ignoble Caliban on any terms that Caliban cares to make?"

Caliban was the central character in James Clouser's rock ballet Caliban, a 90-minute adaptation of The Tempest that was scored with live performances by St. Elmo's Fire. The rock ballet was performed in Houston, Dallas, and Chicago in 1976 and 1977.

Caliban is the name of a character from Marvel comics. He is an albino mutant who lives underground with the Morlocks.

In the Swedish 1989 film The Journey to Melonia, an animated film loosely inspired by The Tempest, there is a character named Caliban, a creature whose face consists of mainly vegetables. Unlike Caliban in The Tempest, this Caliban is kind at heart, and even becomes a hero later in the film.

Caliban is the central character in two works of fiction that act as both re-tellings of and sequels to The Tempest: Caliban's Hour by Tad Williams (HarperCollins, 1994) and Rough Magic by Caryl Cude Mullin (Second City Press, 2009). In both works, Caliban is a more noble character and presented more as Prospero's victim rather than the villain in Shakespeare's play.

Caliban is featured as an antagonist in Dan Simmons' Ilium/Olympos duology (2003, 2005).

Rob Thurman's Cal Leandros series (first published 2006) centres around Caliban "Cal" Leandros, a half-human, half-Auphe (a nightmarish monster) hybrid who kills monsters for fun and cash in NYC with his human brother and their sleazy cohort, car-salesman Robin Goodfellow. This Cal struggles for control every day against his monster half, dealing with sarcasm and dark humor.

Caliban's War is the title of the second novel of The Expanse series, a space opera by James S. A. Corey.

The 2012 Summer Olympics opening ceremony (directed by Danny Boyle) titled Isles of Wonder (a name inspired by The Tempest) was heavily influenced by The Tempest. The musical piece played during the torch lighting ceremony was entitled "Caliban's Dream", and Caliban's monologue from Act 3, Scene ii was quoted by Kenneth Branagh in character as Isambard Kingdom Brunel at the start of the Industrial Revolution set piece. "And I Will Kiss", the title of another specially commissioned track from the ceremony, is also a quote from The Tempest (2:2:148-149). These two songs also appeared on the ceremony's official soundtrack. The 2012 Summer Olympics closing ceremony also featured a recitation of the same monologue, this time by Timothy Spall playing Winston Churchill.

In the preface of The Picture of Dorian Gray, Oscar Wilde muses: "The nineteenth century dislike of Realism is the rage of Caliban seeing his own face in a glass.  The nineteenth century dislike of Romanticism is the rage of Caliban not seeing his own face in a glass."

In The Chilling Adventures of Sabrina, Caliban is a prince of Hell competing for Sabrina's throne, portrayed by Sam Corlett.

In the setting of the tabletop game Warhammer 40,000, Caliban is the name of a planet full of grand forests prowled by man-eating monsters. It is the homeworld of Lion El'Jonson, a wild child who is found and civilized by a knight named Luther, and is later revealed to be the Primarch of the Dark Angels Space Marine Chapter. Several hundred years later, Caliban is destroyed in a battle between Lion and Luther.

In the book Ilium, Caliban is a destructive, powerful humanlike entity who vacillates who he serves; at one point he served Prospero (the noosphere's personification), later works only for himself, but also sometimes aligned with the malevolent destroyer of worlds Setebos.

In the videogame Destiny 2, Caliban's Hand is an exotic armor related to solar energy, added the 23rd of May 2022.

See also 
Arielismo

References

External links 

 Caliban at Sunset, a poem by P. G. Wodehouse.
 
 "Caliban Upon Setebos, a poem by Robert Browning.
 Shakespeare Birthplace Trust - list of past RSC productions

Literary characters introduced in 1611
Male Shakespearean characters
Fictional half-demons
Fictional monsters
Fictional slaves
Characters in The Tempest
Shakespeare villains